Carlos Martiel (born 1989) is a contemporary installation and performance artist.

Martiel was born in Havana, Cuba. He identifies as queer and Afro-Latinx, with Haitian and Jamaican ancestry. He graduated from Cuba's Escuela Nacional de Bellas Artes "San Alejandro" in 2009. In addition, he studied in the Cátedra Arte de Conducta (Behavior Art School) under Tania Bruguera from 2008 to 2010. Martiel lives and works in both Havana and New York City.

Martiel's work can be characterized as endurance art. His artistic practice uses his own body, often nude, in order to draw attention to the embodied experience of Blackness under systems of violence and exploitation. In his durational performances, Martiel frequently subjects himself to physical pain and self-harm. This includes piercing his skin with a miniature flagpole flying an American flag, having a pest exterminator spray his body with insecticide, compressing his legs under the weight of a pear-tree trunk, stitching the collar of a blue shirt to the skin around his neck, and having a piece of his own skin surgically removed and preserved in a gold medal that he had designed. Thematically, his works explore racism and racialization, gender, immigration, and the legacy of European colonialism in the United States.

Martiel's works are included in the collections of the Solomon R. Guggenheim Museum, the Pérez Art Museum Miami, and the Museum of Modern Art, Rio de Janeiro. His awards include a grant from the Franklin Furnace Fund (2016), a Grants & Commissions Program Award from the Cisneros Fontanals Foundation (2014), and the Arte Laguna Prize (2013). In 2001, he also received a Latinx Art Fellowship from the Ford Foundation, Mellon Foundation, and U.S. Latinx Art Forum.

Performances and Exhibitions 

 Arquitectura para un cuerpo, Crystal Bridges Museum of American Art (2022)
 Monumento II, Solomon R. Guggenheim Museum, New York (2021)
 Black Bodies – White Lies, K Contemporary, Denver (2020)
Afro Syncretic [group exhibition], King Juan Carlos I Center, New York University (2020)
Sabor a Lagrimas, Sharjah Biennial 14, United Arab Emirates (2019)
Gente de color (People of Color), Fourteenth Cuenca Biennial, Cuenca, Ecuador (2018)
 Intruder (America), AC Institute, New York (2018)
 América, Pacific Standard Time: LA/LA Performance Art Festival, Museum of Latin American Art, Long Beach (2018)
 Mediterráneo, 57th Venice Biennale (2017)
CUBA: Tatuare la storia [group exhibition], Padiglione d'Arte Contemporanea, Palermo, Italy (2016)
 We the People, Biennale Internationale de Casablanca, Hassan II Mosque, Morocco (2016)
 Intersección, Museo de Arte Contemporáneo del Zulia (MACZUL), Maracaibo, Venezuela (2016)
 30th Anniversary Havana Biennial, Wilfredo Lam Center of Contemporary Art (2014) 
Condecoración Martiel, Carlos, Cisneros Fontanals Art Foundation (2014)
La Otra Bienal de Arte, Video Art of Central America and the Caribbean, La Macarena, Bogota, Colombia (2013) 
Vanishing Point, Nitch Museum, Naples, Italy (2013) 
 Prodigal Son, Witch House , Liverpool, UK (2010)
Source:

References 

Cuban artists
Performance artists
1989 births
Living people